Adrian Sweeney is an Irish former Gaelic footballer who played for An Clochán Liath and the Donegal county team.

Considered one of the finest forwards of his generation, he often played alongside Brendan Devenney for Donegal.

Sweeney played for Donegal from 1996 to 2008. He started the first game of Brian McEniff's last spell as Donegal manager, a league defeat to Galway in Tuam in February 2003, during which he scored two points (one of which was a free). He won an All Star in 2003, a year when Donegal made it to the All-Ireland Senior Football Championship semi-final in which he played and scored four points (including two frees). He played a crucial role in the team that won the county's first National League Division 1 title in 2007. Sweeney won an Ulster Under-21 Football Championship in 1995. However, he never won the Ulster Senior Football Championship. He did play in the 2004 Ulster final against Armagh at Croke Park. He also played in the 2006 Ulster final against the same opponents at the same venue, and scored three points but lost again.

He played for Donegal Boston.

His brother Raymond also played for An Clochán Liath and Donegal.

See also
 List of All Stars Awards winners (football)

References

External links
 Adrian Sweeney at gaainfo.com

Year of birth missing (living people)
Living people
An Clochán Liath Gaelic footballers
Donegal Boston Gaelic footballers
Donegal inter-county Gaelic footballers
Gaelic football forwards
Irish expatriate sportspeople in the United States